Steven Emory (born August 31, 1989 in Fort Collins, Colorado) is an American soccer player.

Career

Youth, College and Amateur
Emory began his career at Fort Collins High School in 2005 where he was named Second Team All-State pick in 2005, First Team All-State selection and First Team All-Front Range, and a Three-year letter winner.  After spending the summer of 2007 with the Colorado Rapids youth system, Emory played four years of college soccer at Metropolitan State University of Denver where he scored 38 goals, and registered 23 assists in 85 games played, leading the Roadrunners to four winning seasons and two NCAA tournament appearances. He was awarded back to back player of the year awards.
2009 Daktronics second team All-America
2009 NSCAA first team All-Central Region
2009 Daktronics Central Region Player of the Year
2009 Daktronics first team All-Central Region
2009 RMAC All-Tournament
2009 RMAC Player of the year
2009 first team All-RMAC
2009 RMAC Offensive Player of the Week (Oct. 20)
2009 RMAC Preseason Player of the Year
2008 NSCAA first team All-West Region
2008 Daktronics second team All-Central Region
2008 second team All-RMAC
2008 RMAC All-Tournament

While in College, Emory also spent 2010 with the Real Colorado Foxes in the USL Premier Development League.

Emory was inducted into the Athletic Hall of Fame in 2019.

Professional
In January 2011, Emory was discovered by the Colorado Rapids and invited to preseason camp as a non-roster player.  On March 2, 2011, Emory became the first Metro State student-athlete to sign a contract with a major professional team in any sport by signing with the Colorado Rapids of Major League Soccer.

Emory made his professional debut on March 30, 2011 in a Lamar Hunt US Open Cup game against Chicago Fire.

Emory's contract was released by Colorado on March 22 and picked up by Narpes Kraft in Finland in April, 2012.

References

External links
 
 Metro State Roadrunners bio

1989 births
Living people
American soccer players
American expatriate soccer players
Metro State Roadrunners men's soccer players
Real Colorado Foxes players
Colorado Rapids players
Soccer players from Colorado
Expatriate footballers in Finland
USL League Two players
Närpes Kraft Fotbollsförening players
Association football midfielders